The 2009 Sicilia Classic Mancuso Company Cup was a professional tennis tournament played on outdoor red clay courts. It was the first edition of the tournament which was part of the 2009 ATP Challenger Tour. It took place in Palermo, Italy between 21 and 27 September 2009.

Singles main draw entrants

Seeds

 Rankings are as of 14 September 2009.

Other entrants
The following players received wildcards into the singles main draw:
  Francesco Aldi
  Alberto Cammarata
  Antonio Comporto
  Andrey Kuznetsov

The following players received entry from the qualifying draw:
  Reda El Amrani
  Sergio Gutiérrez-Ferrol
  Gero Kretschmer
  Walter Trusendi (as a Lucky loser)
  Antal van der Duim
  Kaes Van't Hof (as a Lucky loser)

Champions

Singles

 Adrian Ungur def.  Albert Ramos-Viñolas, 6–4, 6–4

Doubles

 Martin Fischer /  Philipp Oswald def.  Pierre-Ludovic Duclos /  Rogério Dutra da Silva, 4–6, 6–3, [10–5]

References
Official website
ITF search 
2009 Draws

Sicilia Classic Mancuso Company Cup
Clay court tennis tournaments
Sicilia Classic